Pioneer H is an unlaunched unmanned space mission that was part of the US Pioneer program for a planned 1974 launch.  Had this mission and spacecraft been launched, it would have been designated Pioneer 12; that designation was later applied to the Pioneer Venus Orbiter.

History
As planning for the Pioneer 10 and 11 missions progressed, mission scientists found themselves desiring a third probe.  In 1971, a formal mission study was proposed for a spacecraft to be launched to Jupiter in 1974, where it would use the gas giant as a gravitational slingshot to travel outside the ecliptic. This was the first Out-Of-The-Ecliptic mission (OOE) proposed, for Jupiter and solar (Sun) observations.

NASA/Ames Research Center would have managed the project.  The NASA contractor TRW Systems Group (formerly Space Technology Laboratories) would have constructed Pioneer H from the flight-qualified spare components intended for the Pioneer F and G probes (designated Pioneer 10 and Pioneer 11 after launch).

NASA management did not approve the mission proposal, and it was never launched.  In 1976 NASA transferred the craft (without RTG) to the Smithsonian Institution. In January 1977, Pioneer H was moved to the National Air and Space Museum, where it was eventually displayed as a replica of Pioneer 10.

Successor missions
The Pioneer H mission concept was finally realized with the Ulysses mission, which achieved the OOE orbit originally envisioned for Pioneer H.  The Juno mission, currently at Jupiter in a polar orbit, is taking the magnetometer observations of Jupiter's poles that Pioneer H would have performed.

Current location

Pioneer H hangs in the Milestones of Flight Gallery at the National Air and Space Museum in Washington, D.C., serving as a stand-in for the Pioneer 10 probe.

While described in official Smithsonian records as a "replica", the spacecraft was considered fully functional by Pioneer mission planners (though its RTGs were never installed). Mark Wolverton quotes James Van Allen in The Depths of Space:

We mounted an intensive campaign to launch the flight-worthy spare spacecraft and its instrument complement on a low-cost, out-of-ecliptic mission via a high-inclination flyby of Jupiter. However, our case fell on deaf ears at NASA headquarters, and the spare spacecraft now hangs in the main gallery of the National Air and Space Museum, at 1 AU and zero ecliptic latitude.

References

External links 

 The Depths of Space: The Story of the Pioneer Planetary Probes, Mark Wolverton, 2004 
 National Air and Space Museum - Pioneer 10 - Milestones of Flight 
 Assembling for NASM the Pioneer 10 replica
 International Solar Polar mission, 1979

Cancelled spacecraft
Pioneer program
Individual spacecraft in the collection of the Smithsonian Institution
Missions to the Sun